The Embassy of Afghanistan in Islamabad is the diplomatic mission of the Islamic Emirate of Afghanistan to Pakistan.

A new embassy is currently being constructed in the Diplomatic Enclave of Islamabad. Once completed, it will become Afghanistan's largest embassy abroad.

The last Afghan ambassador  to Pakistan before the fall of the Islamic Republic to the Taliban was H.E. Najibullah Alikhel. In July 2021, Afghanistan recalled its diplomats over allegations by Alikhel's daughter Silsila that she has been kidnapped and beaten, which Pakistan denied. In October 2021, despite not recognizing the new government, Pakistan allowed the Taliban to assign diplomats to the embassy as well as the Afghan consulates in Karachi, Peshawar, and Quetta.

See also

List of ambassadors of Afghanistan to Pakistan
List of diplomatic missions of Afghanistan
List of diplomatic missions in Pakistan
Afghanistan-Pakistan relations
Embassy of Pakistan, Kabul

Notes

References

Afghanistan–Pakistan relations
Buildings and structures in Islamabad
Islamabad
Afghanistan